"Fortunate Son" is a 1969 song by Creedence Clearwater Revival.

Fortunate Son may also refer:

Film and television
 Fortunate Son (film), an autobiographical documentary by Canadian director Tony Asimakopoulos
 "Fortunate Son" (The Sopranos), a 2001 episode of The Sopranos
 "Fortunate Son" (Star Trek: Enterprise), a 2001 Star Trek: Enterprise episode
 Fortunate Son (TV series), a Canadian drama that premiered in 2020

Literature
 Fortunate Son (Hatfield), a 2000 biography of George W. Bush by J.H. Hatfield
 Fortunate Son (novel), a 2006 novel by Walter Mosley
 Fortunate Son, an autobiography by Lewis Burwell Puller, Jr.
 Fortunate Son: A Novel of the Greatest Trial in Irish History, a 2014 novel by David Marlett recounting the life of James Annesley

Sports
 "The Fortunate Son", nickname of professional wrestler Ted DiBiase, Jr.